Todd W. Claus (born March 24, 1969) is an American baseball scout. He also has been an infielder, coach, manager and advance scout in professional baseball, and an assistant coach in college baseball.

Early years
Claus was born at Endicott, New York. He graduated from Cardinal Gibbons High School in Fort Lauderdale, Florida, and attended Seminole Community College, Indian River Community College and the University of North Florida, where he played varsity baseball and received a bachelor's degree in management.

Baseball career

Minor league player
Claus signed with the California Angels (now the Los Angeles Angels) as a non-drafted free agent in 1991 and played three seasons of minor league baseball, primarily as a second baseman, and peaking in 1993 with 18 games and 42 at bats with the Midland Angels of the Double-A Texas League. Overall, he batted .204 in 549 professional at bats, with three home runs and 32 runs batted in.

Coach and manager
In 1994, he served as a graduate assistant coach with the University of North Florida, and attended the Major League Baseball Scouting Bureau's "scouts' school", where he graduated at the top of his class. He then rejoined the Angels as a scout and minor league coach with affiliates ranging from the Rookie level to Double-A.

However, he was forced to leave the Angels after the 2003 season when he mistakenly sent a private voice mail supporting Donny Rowland, his mentor and the team's soon-to-be-fired scouting director, to everyone in the team's player development department.

In  he moved to the Red Sox organization as manager of the Sarasota Red Sox of the Class A Florida State League. His Portland clubs included prospects such as Hanley Ramírez, Dustin Pedroia, Jonathan Papelbon, Jon Lester, and Jacoby Ellsbury. Overall, as a minor league manager, his teams won 294 games, losing 258 (.533) with one championship.

Scout
Claus' and LeVangie's scouting reports were credited with helping Boston win the 2007 American League title and 2007 World Series. Following the  season, which saw Boston fall in Game 7 of the 2008 American League Championship Series, Claus left the professional baseball ranks to become the assistant baseball coach of Jacksonville University of Jacksonville, Florida. After spending the 2009 season in that post, he rejoined Boston as a member of its international scouting group on November 11, 2009, as the club's Latin American scouting coordinator and international cross-checker. In , the Red Sox promoted him to global scouting supervisor.

References

Further reading
 "Ultimate Gamer Finds His Niche as a Teacher," Baseball America, November 9, 2006

External links
 
 Jacksonville University biography 

1969 births
Living people
Anaheim Angels scouts
Baseball coaches from Florida
Boise Hawks players
Boston Red Sox scouts
California Angels scouts
Jacksonville Dolphins baseball coaches
Midland Angels players
Palm Springs Angels players
People from Endicott, New York
Portland Sea Dogs managers
Quad Cities River Bandits players
University of North Florida alumni